Eugene Gano Hay (March 26, 1853 – February 21, 1933) was a member of the Board of General Appraisers.

Education and career

Born on March 26, 1853, in Charlestown, Indiana, Hay read law and entered private practice in Madison, Indiana from 1877 to 1880. He was prosecuting attorney for Jefferson County and Switzerland County, Indiana from 1881 to 1885. Hay resumed private practice in Minneapolis, Minnesota from 1886 to 1889. He was a member of the Minnesota House of Representatives in 1889, and was United States Attorney for the District of Minnesota from 1890 to 1894. In 1894 he resumed private practice in Minneapolis, which he continued until 1903.

Federal judicial service

Hay received a recess appointment from President Theodore Roosevelt on September 21, 1903, to a seat on the Board of General Appraisers vacated by Member George C. Tichenor. He was nominated to the same position by President Roosevelt on November 10, 1903. He was confirmed by the United States Senate on November 24, 1903, and received his commission on November 25, 1903. His service terminated on November 30, 1923, due to his retirement. He was succeeded by George M. Young.

Death

Hay died on February 21, 1933, in Summit, New Jersey.

References

1853 births
1933 deaths
People from Charlestown, Indiana
Members of the Board of General Appraisers
Members of the Minnesota House of Representatives
United States Attorneys for the District of Minnesota
Indiana lawyers
Minnesota lawyers
United States Article I federal judges appointed by Theodore Roosevelt
20th-century American judges
United States federal judges admitted to the practice of law by reading law